The 2020 Pocono 350 was a NASCAR Cup Series race held on June 28, 2020 at Pocono Raceway in Long Pond, Pennsylvania. Contested over 140 laps on the  triangular racecourse, it was the 15th race of the 2020 NASCAR Cup Series season.

Entry list 
 (R) denotes rookie driver.
 (i) denotes driver who are ineligible for series driver points.

Qualifying
Ryan Preece was awarded the pole for the race as determined by the top 20 from Saturday's finishing order inverted.

Starting Lineup

Race

Stage Results

Stage One
Laps: 30

Stage Two
Laps: 55

Final Stage Results

Stage Three
Laps: 55

Race statistics
 Lead changes: 12 among 8 different drivers
 Cautions/Laps: 8 for 32
 Red flags: 1 for 50 minutes and 50 seconds
 Time of race: 2 hours, 50 minutes and 54 seconds
 Average speed:

Media

Television
Fox Sports televised the race in the United States on FS1. Mike Joy and six-time Pocono winner Jeff Gordon will cover the race from the Fox Sports studio in Charlotte. Jamie Little handled the pit road duties. Larry McReynolds provided insight from the Fox Sports studio in Charlotte.

Radio
MRN had the radio call for the race which was also simulcast on Sirius XM NASCAR Radio. Alex Hayden, Jeff Striegle and Rusty Wallace called the race in the booth when the field raced through the tri-oval. Dave Moody called the race from the Sunoco spotters stand outside turn 2 when the field raced through turns 1 and 2. Mike Bagley called the race from a platform inside the backstretch when the field raced down the backstretch. Kurt Becker called the race from the Sunoco spotters stand outside turn 4 when the field raced through turns 3 and 4. Steve Post and Kim Coon worked pit road for the radio side.

Standings after the race

Drivers' Championship standings

Manufacturers' Championship standings

Note: Only the first 16 positions are included for the driver standings.
. – Driver has clinched a position in the NASCAR Cup Series playoffs.

References

Pocono 350
Pocono 350
Pocono 350
NASCAR races at Pocono Raceway